The Making of an American is a 1920 short silent film used as an educational tool in the governmental Americanization initiatives to assimilate immigrants into mainstream culture, especially by encouraging them to learn the English language. It was produced for the State of Connecticut Department of Americanization by the Worcester Film Corp., a company founded in 1918 in Worcester, Massachusetts. The film was rediscovered and preserved by Northeast Historic Film (NHF) a regional moving image archive in New England.

Synopsis of film
An enterprising young Italian who comes to America is forced to take a position as a day laborer, which is far below his ability and standard of living, solely because he cannot speak English. Even a laborer, however, must know the language of the country where he is employed, as Pete soon found to his cost. An unattended freight elevator, a sign in English that he could not read, a struggle of an instant, and then the hospital. It was a sadder and wiser man who came out a few weeks later. When he passed the post office, and a saw a sign in several languages calling upon foreigners to learn English, and to attend night school, he was prepared for the message that was destined to change the entire course of his life. Night school for Pete was the result. Anyone familiar with such work will experience anew the keen realization of what it means to the newcomer, the crowded roomful of eager listeners, trying so hard, following so patiently and docilely, the enthusiastic teacher's efforts, in short, the making of Pete. He now is able to secure a suitable position and rises rapidly.
Education Film Magazine (1920)

Cast
Emile De Verny - Italian immigrant

Production and background
Vintage Connecticut government reports on the making of the film and its dissemination, indicate that the film was shown to more than 112,500 people the year it was made, and that copies were sold to other states interested in Americanization programs. The film was targeted to industrial workers and contains location filming at the Hartford Rubber Works Company. The film was lost until 1999 when Alan Kattelle donated a film copy among a collection of other reels to Northeast Historic Film. The Kattelle print was on 28mm film stock, an extremely rare format that was primarily used for educational film distribution from 1913 to 1923.

In 2005, the film was selected for preservation in the United States National Film Registry by the Library of Congress as being "culturally, historically, or aesthetically significant".

See also 
Immigration to the United States of America
Melting pot
Salad bowl (cultural idea)

References

External links 

The Making of an American essay  by Charles "Buckey" Grimm on the National Film Registry website 
NHF video purchase
 
NFR homepage
NHF homepage

1920 films
United States National Film Registry films
American silent short films
American black-and-white films
1920 short films
1920s educational films
1920 documentary films
1920s short documentary films
American short documentary films
1920s American films
American educational films